Tell Elkarame is a Syrian village located in Al-Dana Nahiyah in Harem District, Idlib. According to the Syria Central Bureau of Statistics (CBS), Tell Elkarame had a population of 3785 in the 2004 census.

History
Built probably under Marcus Aurelius ( AD), it was used by Justinian in 363 to quickly advance against the Sassanids on the Euphrates.

In the vicinity of Tall 'Aqibrīn occurred the Battle of Ager Sanguinis, where Roger of Salerno was killed.

References

Sources 
 

Populated places in Harem District